Zlatko Todorovski (born 30 April 1972) is a retired Macedonian international football player.

Club career
Playing as midfielder, he played with FK Vardar, FK Rabotnički and FK Makedonija Gjorče Petrov in the Macedonian First League. In June 1999 he left Vardar and signed with German side VfB Leipzig, but during the winter break he moved to Serbian side OFK Beograd and played with them the second half of the 1999–2000 First League of FR Yugoslavia.

International career
He made his senior debut for Macedonia in a June 1998 friendly match against Bosnia and Herzegovina and has earned a total of 2 caps, scoring no goals. His second and final international was a September 1998 friendly against Egypt.

Honours
Vardar
Macedonian First League: 2001–02
Macedonian Cup: 1997–98, 1998–99

References

External links
 
 

1972 births
Living people
Association football midfielders
Macedonian footballers
North Macedonia international footballers
FK Vardar players
1. FC Lokomotive Leipzig players
OFK Beograd players
FK Rabotnički players
FK Makedonija Gjorče Petrov players
Macedonian First Football League players
Regionalliga players
First League of Serbia and Montenegro players
Macedonian expatriate footballers
Expatriate footballers in Germany
Macedonian expatriate sportspeople in Germany
Expatriate footballers in Serbia and Montenegro
Macedonian expatriate sportspeople in Serbia and Montenegro